Events in the year 1895 in Brazil.

Incumbents

Federal government
President: Prudente de Morais
Vice-President: Manuel Vitorino

Governors 
 Alagoas: Manuel Gomes Ribeiro (until 16 July), Jose Vieira Peixoto (starting 16 July)
 Amazonas: Eduardo Gonçalves Ribeiro
 Bahia: Rodrigues Lima
 Ceará: Antônio Nogueira Accioli
 Goiás:
 until July 16: José Inácio Xavier de Brito
 July 16 - July 18: Antônio Caiado
 from July 18: Francisco Leopoldo Rodrigues Jardim
 Maranhão:
 until February 2: Casimiro Vieira Jr
 February 2 - August 13: Manuel Belfort Vieira
 August 13 - December 16: Casimiro Vieira Jr
 from December 16: Alfredo Martins
 Mato Grosso: Manuel José Murtinho
 Minas Gerais: Bias Fortes
 Pará: Lauro Sodré
 Paraíba: Álvaro Lopes Machado
 Paraná: Francisco Xavier da Silva
 Pernambuco: Alexandre José Barbosa Lima
 Piauí: Coriolano de Carvalho e Silva
 Rio Grande do Norte: Pedro de Albuquerque Maranhão 
 Rio Grande do Sul: Júlio Prates de Castilhos
 Santa Catarina:
 São Paulo: 
 Sergipe:

Vice governors 
 Rio de Janeiro: 
 Rio Grande do Norte:
 São Paulo:

Events
24 June – Battle of Campo Osório
23 August – A peace treaty is signed in Pelotas, bringing an end to the Federalist Revolution.
5 November – Japan establishes diplomatic relations with Brazil.

Births
14 June – Silvio Lagreca, football manager (died 1966)
29 June – João Cabanas, soldier involved in the tenentismo movement (died 1974)
26 July – Cassiano Ricardo, journalist, literary critic, and poet (died 1974)
31 October – Oswaldo Goeldi, artist (died 1961)

Deaths
24 June – Luís Filipe de Saldanha da Gama, rebel admiral
29 July – Floriano Peixoto, 2nd President of Brazil (born 1839)
25 December – Raul Pompeia, novelist (born 1863)

References

 
1890s in Brazil
Years of the 19th century in Brazil
Brazil
Brazil